The 1940 Colorado Buffaloes football team was an American football team that represented the University of Colorado as a member of the Mountain States Conference (MSC) during the 1940 college football season. Led by first-year head coach Frank Potts, the Buffaloes compiled an overall record of 5–3–1 with a mark of 4–1–1 in conference play, tying for second place in the MSC.

Schedule

References

Colorado
Colorado Buffaloes football seasons
Colorado Buffaloes football